Winnie Bamara (born 1939 or 1940; year of death unknown) was the first Indigenous Australian woman artist to paint in a European realist style. Her ability to paint scenes accurately and solely from memory attracted wide attention in the 1950s. She was hailed as a "female Albert Namatjira".

Early life
Winnie Bamara  was born in 1939 or 1940 in the South Australian Nullarbor Station near Ooldea on the East-West line. When she was seven, she was taken to the Plymouth Brethren Umeewarra Aborigines' Mission Station near Port Augusta's main street. She remembered suffering from painful "sand" in her eyes (trachoma, in fact), for treatment of which Winnie spent three months in the Adelaide Children's Hospital and there also fell victim to polio, but this was not noticed until after she had returned to the mission station. Polio affected Winnie's left arm which was thinner than the right. Later, she also suffered from diabetes.

Artistic talent
She attended the mission school, a crowded galvanised iron building, where it was noticed that her learning had been affected by her time in hospital, but her teacher Miss M. Cantle noted and encouraged her drawing ability, giving her a box of watercolours with which it was found that, without any instruction, she could paint perspectively correct specific landscape scenes around Port Augusta, completely from memory. In a 1957 newspaper interview Cantle reported;

Bamara became a teacher at the Mission School in her 20s.

Bamara's image-making was in the Western representational style and she was credited with a "photographic memory". She was the first Australian indigenous woman known to work in the realist manner. Attempts to provide her with lessons in a correspondence course, and from a visiting artist, proved fruitless, and Cantle supported the young artist's need to learn by herself. Nevertheless, in October 1957 teachers at the National Art School in Sydney, which had provided the correspondence course, granted her free tuition and that December she flew there and spent a week in the School, but was too reticent to talk to teachers or fellow students. Principal of the School, Mr. L. Roy Davies, said: "It is extraordinary that an untrained girl in an aborigine mission station should paint realistic pictures of her surroundings."

Reputation 
Bamara's talent attracted the attention of Adelaide and interstate newspapers. In 1959 photographer David Beal, passing the mission on his way back from an assignment in far north Australia, stopped to photograph her and examples of her work. By that time the Mission was crowded with 59 children accommodated in the Home, which tended to 49 other children resident on the Reserve with their families. Beal's newspaper The Sunday Mail showed interest in encouraging and publicising her work and sponsored an exhibition in Adelaide at the Public Library on North Terrace in February 1959 to the opening of which she was driven by the then Mayor of Port Augusta, Mr Lyn Riches, who was also the Speaker in the Adelaide Parliament. He consequently introduced many Australian and overseas dignitaries to Winnie's artwork. Influential South Australian journalist Sir Lloyd Dumas opened the show to an audience of 200 and, seen by 8,000 visitors, it sold out.

Later career 
By 1961 Bamara had completed her first year of study at the South Australia School of Art in Adelaide where she was awarded the Frank and David Bulbeck Prize for most improved student in oils that year. She showed during 1963 in the Advertiser Open-Air Art Exhibition.

In 1985, at 45, Bamara was still painting and was granted $1400 for the purchase of art materials from the Aboriginal Arts Board

In 1987 Bamara, who lived near Maralinga, produced a painting for a poster protesting nuclear testing at Maralinga, for the Australian Council for Disarmament and Peace for Maralinga Day, 1987 which was produced by Common Ground Magazine with the support of the people of the Maralinga–Tjarutja community. Her image shows a nuclear bomb exploding on the Maralinga lands as three Indigenous people stand watching, with text that briefly discusses the history of the British Government testing of nuclear bombs at Maralinga.

Personal life
In the 1960s Bamara married William Fredrick Smith (1942 – 2014) and their children were Russell, Robyn, Anthony, and Shona, and Eugene and Lillian, who were both deceased at the time of his death. The date of Bamara's death is not recorded, but she was noted as "the late" Winnie Bamara in husband Smith's 2014 obituary in the Adelaide Advertiser. She is buried in the Port Augusta General Cemetery with Nellie Bamara.

Reception
On viewing her work before her first exhibition, National Gallery of Australia director Robert Campbell remarked;

Writing in The Canberra Times about the "Aboriginal Art Show" at the Academy of Science in Acton, Canberra, in which her work was shown with that of Gordon Waye and Bill Lennon, Melbourne critic John Reed called her "gifted", comparing her work with that of Belgian emigrant and Australian autodidact painter Henri Bastin.

Writers and critics often compared Bamara with Albert Namatjira, though she is now not as well remembered. Principal at the National Art School L. Ron Davies reported that;

Bamara's work has since largely slipped from attention and at auctions in 2015 her work on paper fetched only $110, and her paintings less than $100.

Exhibitions
1959: An exhibition of watercolors by Winnie Bamara : sponsored by The Sunday Mail, Public library lecture room, North Terrace, February 17–24
1963: Advertiser Open-air Art Exhibition, Adelaide
1974: Aboriginal Art Show at the Academy of Science in Acton, Canberra
2010, May: Winnie Bamara – The shy girl with the photographic eyes, Port Augusta Cultural Centre

Collections
A painting by Bamara was presented to the President Sukarno of Indonesia, and one was purchased by Prince Philip.
National Museum of Australia

References

Australian women artists
Australian painters
Aboriginal peoples of South Australia
Aboriginal communities in South Australia
Australian Aboriginal artists
Indigenous Australian artists
20th-century births
Year of birth uncertain
Year of death unknown